West View is a borough in Allegheny County in the U.S. state of Pennsylvania, just north of downtown Pittsburgh. The population was 6,685 at the 2020 census.

Geography and climate
West View is located at  (40.518368, -80.033645).

Demographics

As of the census of 2000, there were 7,277 people, 3,149 households, and 1,908 families residing in the borough. The population density was 7,210.8 people per square mile (2,781.8/km2). There were 3,304 housing units at an average density of 3,273.9 per square mile (1,263.1/km2). The racial makeup of the borough was 97.62% White, 0.93% African American, 0.07% Native American, 0.52% Asian, 0.18% from other races, and 0.67% from two or more races. Hispanic or Latino of any race were 0.54% of the population.

There were 3,149 households, out of which 28.3% had children under the age of 18 living with them, 45.3% were married couples living together, 11.8% had a female householder with no husband present, and 39.4% were non-families. 33.7% of all households were made up of individuals, and 14.8% had someone living alone who was 65 years of age or older. The average household size was 2.31 and the average family size was 3.01.

In the borough the population was spread out, with 23.4% under the age of 18, 6.6% from 18 to 24, 32.6% from 25 to 44, 21.3% from 45 to 64, and 16.0% who were 65 years of age or older. The median age was 38 years. For every 100 females there were 88.3 males. For every 100 females age 18 and over, there were 84.0 males.

The median income for a household in the borough was $38,264, and the median income for a family was $48,255,000. Males had a median income of $32,700 versus $27,031 for females. The per capita income for the borough was $21,025. About 4.4% of families and 6.4% of the population were below the poverty line, including 7.0% of those under age 18 and 9.1% of those age 65 or over.

Government and politics

Council members
[2017-2019] Democrats-6 (Schellhaus, Kircher, Borio, Aguglia, Steele, Mikec), Unknown party-1 (Miller), Republicans-0

Education
West View, along with neighboring (and surrounding) Ross Township, is served by the North Hills School District.

West View Park
From 1906 to 1977, West View was home to one of the most remembered Pittsburgh amusement parks, West View Park.  Located in the neighborhood's valley on Perry Highway/U.S. 19, this one-midway trolley park featured two beloved roller coasters: The Dips, with its unique banked turn-around curve, and the Racing Whippet, which featured two coasters on a strategically placed single track so that the train that started on the left of the loading platform came back on the right side and vice versa. Another popular park attraction was "Danceland", an entertainment hall that featured many performers from big band to rock and roll over the years, most notably The Rolling Stones in 1964. Danceland burned to the ground in 1973 and was not rebuilt.

West View Park closed for good at the end of the 1977 season.  Its competing amusement park, Kennywood, was continuously expanding with bigger attractions, which West View was unable to do because of its location.  Today, West View Park Shopping Center (originally signed with a roller coaster resembling the Dips, replaced in 2010 by a new sign with a carousel horse on top) occupies the amusement park site. The shopping center opened in 1981. There are no traces of the park left, but several nearby businesses feature old memorabilia (such as signs, photos, and tickets).  The since-closed Wendy's fast-food restaurant in the West View Plaza was remodeled in 2008, and featured several new pictures that were on their walls that show the old Park.

The coming-of-age novel Stick Man, about a boy growing up in a bohemian household, with an accompanying musical soundtrack, is set in West View. Several key scenes are set in West View Park. The novel was written by West View native Richard Rossi.

References

External links
 Borough website
 West View Historical Society

Populated places established in 1905
Boroughs in Allegheny County, Pennsylvania
1905 establishments in Pennsylvania